Kim Hyun-Ok (born May 14, 1974) is a South Korean handball player who competed in the 2000 and 2004 Summer Olympics.

In 2000, she was part of the South Korean team which finished fourth in the Olympic tournament. She played all seven matches and scored 28 goals.

Four years later she won the silver medal with the South Korean team. She played one match and scored two goals.

External links
Profile at databaseolympics.com (archived)

1974 births
Living people
South Korean female handball players
Olympic handball players of South Korea
Handball players at the 2000 Summer Olympics
Handball players at the 2004 Summer Olympics
Olympic silver medalists for South Korea
Olympic medalists in handball
Asian Games medalists in handball
Handball players at the 1994 Asian Games
Handball players at the 1998 Asian Games
Handball players at the 2002 Asian Games
Medalists at the 2004 Summer Olympics
Asian Games gold medalists for South Korea
Medalists at the 1994 Asian Games
Medalists at the 1998 Asian Games
Medalists at the 2002 Asian Games